Galium aristatum, the awned bedstraw, is a plant species in the Rubiaceae, currently (May 2014) accepted as a distinct species. It is native to the Alps and the Pyrenees Mountains of Europe (Spain, France, Italy, Switzerland, Austria and Germany). It is also reportedly naturalized in a few places in New York State in the United States.

References

External links

arenarium
Flora of Spain
Flora of France
Flora of Italy
Flora of Switzerland
Flora of Austria
Flora of Germany
Flora of the Alps
Flora of the Pyrenees
Flora of New York (state)
Plants described in 1762
Taxa named by Carl Linnaeus
Flora without expected TNC conservation status